was the patriarchal head of the prominent Japanese Hatoyama political family which has been called "Japan's Kennedy family."

Early life and education 
Hatoyama was born to a samurai family of the Katsuyama clan in present-day Minato, Tokyo.

He graduated from the Tokyo Kaisei School in 1875. He was selected for a government-sponsored study abroad program and attended Columbia University (B.L., 1877) and Yale University Law School (M.L., 1878; D.C.L., 1880).

Career
When he returned to Tokyo in 1880, Hatoyama opened a law practice, while simultaneously lecturing at the University of Tokyo.

He thereafter joined the Rikken Kaishintō political party founded by Ōkuma Shigenobu and became active in politics. In 1890, at Okuma's urging, he was appointed president of the Tokyo Semmon Gakko, which shortly thereafter became Waseda University. He headed this institution until 1907, although his title was largely honorary in nature. In 1901, he was invited to Yale for its 200th anniversary celebration, and awarded an honorary doctorate in law.

He was elected to the House of Representatives in the 1892 general election and was re-elected eight times thereafter. He became House Speaker in 1896. However, a rift developed between Hatoyama and Okuma. Although Hatoyama angled to become foreign minister in Okuma's first cabinet, he was passed over for the post and only served as Vice Minister in 1898. In April 1907, he was removed from his post at Waseda and demoted to board member status. He left the Rikken Kaishinto in January 1908 to join the rival Rikken Seiyukai party.

He was elected to the Tokyo Municipal Assembly in 1908. In 1910, he was elected President of the Tokyo Bar Association.

Family

His wife, Haruko Hatoyama, was a co-founder of what is known today as Kyoritsu Women's University.  His son is former Prime Minister Ichirō Hatoyama, who founded and was the first president of the Liberal Democratic Party (LDP). His grandson was former Foreign Minister Iichirō Hatoyama.  His younger great-grandson Kunio Hatoyama served as Minister of Internal Affairs and Communications under Prime Minister Taro Aso until June 12, 2009.  His older great-grandson Yukio Hatoyama is the leader of the Democratic Party of Japan (DPJ) and represents the 9th district of Hokkaidō in the House of Representatives. Yukio became Prime Minister on September 16, 2009, following a win by the opposition coalition in the 2009 elections. His son-in-law was Suzuki Kisaburō, a judge, prosecutor, procurator and Minister of Justice and Home Minister.

Family tree

Residence 
Hatoyama and his family resided in the Otowa neighborhood of Bunkyo, Tokyo in 1891. Following the Great Kanto Earthquake, his son Ichiro commissioned a new Western-style mansion on the site which is now known as Hatoyama Hall (鳩山会館 Hatoyama Kaikan).

Notes

References
 Itoh, Mayumi (2003). The Hatoyama Dynasty: Japanese Political Leadership through the Generations. New York: Palgrave Macmillan. , . .

1856 births
1911 deaths
University of Tokyo alumni
Columbia Law School alumni
Yale Law School alumni
Kazuo
20th-century Japanese lawyers
Japanese diplomats
Japanese educators
Speakers of the House of Representatives (Japan)
Members of the House of Representatives (Empire of Japan)
Waseda University
19th-century Japanese lawyers
Parents of prime ministers of Japan